Lee Agnew (born 13 January 1971 in Dunfermline, Scotland) is a Scottish drummer and percussionist. He is the son of bassist Pete Agnew. In 1999, Agnew was working as a drum technician for Nazareth when he became their new drummer following the death of Darrell Sweet.

References

1971 births
Living people
People from Dunfermline
Scottish rock drummers
British male drummers
Nazareth (band) members
21st-century drummers
21st-century British male musicians